Harlow Town Football Club is an English football club based in Harlow, Essex.

The club is best known for the 1979–80 FA Cup, in which it reached the fourth round, eliminating two Football League sides Southend United and Leicester City before losing to Watford at Vicarage Road.

History
The club was originally formed in 1879, playing its first match on 18 October 1879 against Saffron Walden. In those early days the club, just known as Harlow, played friendly matches against local opposition until the formation of East Herts League in 1896. In 1898, the club merged with Netteswell and Burnt Mill and were briefly renamed Harlow and Burnt Mill F.C., but the merger was reversed in 1902.

The club moved into the Spartan League in 1932 and were granted Senior Status in 1937, competing in the FA Cup and Essex Senior Cups for the first time. At this time Harlow had one of the smallest populations for clubs competing at this level, a far cry from today where the population is around 86,000.

Over the years Harlow, which became a New Town in the early 1950s, expanded beyond recognition, and the football club grew with the town. In 1954, the club joined the Premier Division of the London League. In 1960, they won the League Cup, and moved to the newly built Sportcentre on Hammarskjold Road. In 1961 they switched to the Delphian League. In 1963, it merged into the Athenian League and the club were placed in Division Two. After finishing third in 1963–64, they were promoted to Division One. Due to Harlow's facilities at the Sportcentre, the club attracted well-known teams to the area during this period. In July 1966, Harlow Town arranged a friendly match against Uruguay, who were staying nearby in preparation for that summer's FIFA World Cup. Uruguay defeated Harlow 6–1. In 1968, S.L. Benfica reached the European Cup final against Manchester United at Wembley Stadium, and prepared for the final at the Sportcentre; their team included the 1966 World Cup Golden Boot winner Eusébio.

In 1971–72, the club won Division One, and were promoted to the Premier Division of the Athenian League. In 1973, the club switched to Division Two of the Isthmian League, renamed Division One in 1977. In 1978–79, they won Division One and were promoted to the Premier Division.

The 1979–80 season saw the club make its best-ever run in the FA Cup. They entered at the preliminary round, beating Lowestoft Town, Hornchurch, Bury Town, Harwich & Parkeston and Margate to reach the first round proper for the first time, where they defeated Leytonstone/Ilford 2–1. In the second round, they drew 1–1 away at Football League side Southend United before winning the replay at the Sportcentre 1–0 in front of 5,000 spectators. The club were then drawn away to Second Division leaders Leicester City. After a 1–1 draw at Filbert Street, Harlow famously won the replay at the Sportcentre 1–0, watched by a club-record attendance of 9,723. In the fourth round Harlow were drawn away to Watford, losing 4–3.

In the 1981–82 season, the club were relegated, but returned to the Premier Division after a single season in Division One. However, two consecutive relegations in 1984–85 and 1985–86 saw the club drop into Division Two North. In 1988–89, they won the division and returned to Division One.

The club's plans to leave the Sportcentre for a new stadium on Roydon Road collapsed during the 1991–92 season, and the Isthmian League closed the Sportcentre after it no longer met league requirements. The team fulfilled the remainder of their home games at local venues including Sawbridgeworth, Bishop's Stortford, Ware and Aveley. The club dropped out of football for the 1992–93 season.

Upon being voted back into the Isthmian League for the 1993–94 season after upgrading the Sportcentre, the club were forced to drop into Division Three. In 1997–98, they were promoted to Division Two, and the following season were promoted to Division One. In 2004 the club were transferred to Division One East of the Southern League, but returned to the Isthmian League in 2006.

In October 2006, the club moved to its new ground at Barrow's Farm. After finishing as runners-up in Division One North in 2006–07 they won the promotion play-offs and were promoted to the Premier Division after defeating A.F.C. Sudbury in the final. However, they were relegated back to Division One North at the end of the 2008–09 season.

In January 2010, new owners took control of the club, with former manager Tommy Cunningham returning to the club alongside business partner John Barnett. The 2010–11 season saw Kevin Warren become the Hawks manager, but a run of defeats led to Danny Chapman replacing him at the helm. Chapman then turned the tide and took the club to the Division One North play-offs after finishing fourth, but failed to reach the final after being defeated by Wingate & Finchley.

At the start of the 2014–15 season Harlow Town launched The Harlow Academy, a youth set-up which incorporated 21 youth teams playing at The Harlow Arena. After a tightly contested league campaign, Harlow missed out the league title and automatic promotion by one point, finishing behind Needham Market Another play-off campaign beckoned, but Harlow lost 4–3 to Thurrock in the semi-finals after extra-time.

The 2015–16 season saw Harlow Town go on a club record streak of 12 consecutive wins between 19 December 2015 and 13 February 2016, propelling themselves into the play-offs, finishing the season in third place, setting up a third consecutive appearance in the play-offs. The Hawks hosted A.F.C. Hornchurch in the final at the Harlow Arena, where 1,655 spectators saw Harlow claim promotion to the Premier Division with a 3–1 win.

In the 2016–17 season, Harlow achieved a new club record highest league finish of tenth in the Isthmian Premier Division, their first campaign at that level since 2009. The 2017–18 season was a fierce relegation battle in the Isthmian Premier division, with Harlow Town eventually finishing one place above the relegation zone.

The Club once again fought against relegation throughout the 2018–19 season, however the challenge proved too great and Harlow Town finished bottom of the league table, seven points from safety. With the Hawks heading back to Step 4, they were allocated to the Isthmian League South Central division. Despite starting the season strongly and leading the league table at once stage, a run of poor results leading up to Christmas saw Harlow Town fall off the pace. As a result, Danny Chapman resigned as manager in January 2020, after nine years in the role, to be replaced by Mark Holloway.

The start to the 2020 season was one of turmoil, with the COVID-19 pandemic causing disruption to the campaign preparations. Dave Collis replaced Mark Holloway as Manager in October, and Collis himself was relieved of his managerial duties in December after a run of nine consecutive defeats, to be replaced by former Manager Danny Chapman who stepped back into the role after some time away from the game.

In December 2022, Harlow Town withdrew from the Southern Football League, as problems with their artificial pitch left them unable to fulfil their fixtures. As of January 2023, the club are attempting to resolve these issues and secure a return to the league pyramid for the 2023-24 season.

Club officials

Managerial history

Ten-year history

Stadium

In their long history, Harlow Town have had three home venues. From the club's formation right up until 1960, the club played their home games at the Green Man Playing Fields, with its first competitive game coming against Bishop's Stortford Nonconformist Grammar School. Harlow Town's last game at its original home was against East Ham United on 30 April 1960, with Harlow winning the game 2–1.

For the start of the 1960–61 season, Harlow had moved to a new home on Hammarskjold Road, to the newly built Harlow Sportcentre, the first Sports Centre in England. The Town's first competitive game in their new home was against Epping Town in the London League on 27 August 1960, with the game finishing in a 1–1 draw. The Sportcentre hosted some of Harlow's greatest moments, including the FA Cup giant-killings of Southend United and Leicester City in the 1979–1980 season. Harlow's final full season at the Sportcentre came in 2005–06, with their last scheduled game against Spalding United in the 2006 East Anglian Cup final, but due to delays at the new ground, the final game at the Sportcentre was on 2 September 2006 in an FA Cup Preliminary Round match against Saffron Walden Town, the team Harlow faced in their first ever match.

Eventually, Harlow moved to their new home at Barrow's Farm in October 2006, with the opening match at the new ground on 18 October with Harlow defeating Ware 2–0. The official record attendance at the stadium is 2,149, against Macclesfield Town, then of League Two in the FA Cup First Round Proper on 8 November 2008; Macclesfield won the game 2–0. In the summer of 2013, following investment from the owners, a brand new 3G playing surface was laid to allow regular use of the pitch by the local community without impacting the turf. This coincided with the re-branding of the ground to The Harlow Arena, as a primary venue for Harlow and its residents.

Honours
Isthmian League
Division One Champions 1978–79
Division One North Play-Off Winners  2006–07,  2015-16
Division Two North Champions  1988–89
Athenian League
Division One Champions 1971–72
Essex Senior Cup
Winners 1978–79
East Anglian Cup
Winners 1989–90, 2001–02, 2005–06
London League Cup
Champions 1959–60
West Essex Border Charity Cup
Winners 1923–24
Spartan League
Division One Cup Winners 1952–53
East Herts League
Division One Champions 1911–12, 1922–23, 1928–29, 1929–30
Challenge Cup Winners 1929–30, 1930–31, 1931–32
Stansted & District League
Division One Champions 1923–24, 1924–25, 1927–28, 1928–29
Rolleston Cup
Winners 1924–25
Epping Hospital Shield
Winners 1938–39, 1946–47, 1947–48, 1948–49

Records
Record Victory: 14–0 vs Bishop's Stortford, 11 April 1925
Record Defeat: 0–11 vs Ware, 6 March 1948
High-Scoring Draw: 5–5 vs Southall, 1 February 1975
Highest Attendance (Sportcentre): 9,723 vs Leicester City, 8 January 1980
Highest Attendance (Harlow Arena): 2,149 vs Macclesfield Town, 8 November 2008
Highest League finish: 10th in Isthmian Premier Division, 2016–17
Most Appearances: Norman Gladwin (639), 1951–70
Most Goals in a Season: Dick Marshall (64), 1928–29
Most Goals in a Season (Post-War): Alex Read (52), 2013–14
Consecutive League Wins: 12 (19 December 2015 – 13 February 2016)
Consecutive League Defeats: 11 (1 January 1977 – 5 March 1977)
Most Wins in a Season: 31 out of 42 (1978–79)
Most Draws in a Season: 16 out of 42 (1987–88, 2000–01, 2005–06)
Most Defeats in a Season: 29 out of 42 (2009–10)

References

External links
Official club website
Barrows Farm

Association football clubs established in 1879
Athenian League
Delphian League
Football clubs in Essex
Football clubs in England
Harlow
Isthmian League
Southern Football League clubs
1879 establishments in England